Euphorbia lathyris, the caper spurge or paper spurge, is a species of spurge native to southern Europe (Italy, Greece, Spain, Portugal), northwest Africa, and eastward through southwest Asia to western China.

Other names occasionally used include gopher spurge, gopher plant or mole plant.

Growth
It is an erect biennial (occasionally annual) plant growing up to 1.5 m tall, with a glaucous blue-green stem. The leaves are arranged in decussate opposite pairs, and are lanceolate, 5–15 cm long and 1-2.5 cm broad, glaucous blue-green with a waxy texture and pale greenish-white midrib and veins. The flowers are green to yellow-green, 4 mm diameter, with no petals. The seeds are green ripening to brown or grey, produced in globular clusters 13–17 mm diameter of three seeds compressed together.

Chemical characteristics
All parts of the plant, including the seeds and roots, are poisonous. Handling may cause skin irritation as the plant produces latex. While poisonous to humans and most livestock, goats sometimes eat it and are immune to the toxin. However, the toxin can be passed through the goat's milk.

Habitat
Away from its native range, it is widely naturalised in many regions, where it is often considered an invasive weed. It grows in partial shade to full sun in USDA zones 5–9.

Uses
It is used in folk medicine as a remedy for cancer, corns, and warts and has purportedly been used by beggars to induce skin boils.

References

lathyris
Garden plants
Medicinal plants of Africa
Medicinal plants of Asia
Medicinal plants of Europe
Plants described in 1753
Taxa named by Carl Linnaeus